The World Team Trophy was a team cue sports event, held in Roissy-en-France, Paris, France. The event was held between 11–12 March 2019. The event sees teams of three players from different disciplines compete in the disciplines of pool, snooker and carrom. The event saw both a men's and women's tournament. The tournament received teams from France, Europe, Asia and Rest of the World.

The event was won by Team Europe in the men's competition, whilst Asia won the women's competition. The event was the first tournament of its kind, with all three disciplines being played across tables simultaneously.

Teams
Source:

Men

Women

References

World Team Trophy
World Team Trophy
World Team Trophy
World Team Trophy